Area codes 705, 249, and 683 are telephone area codes in the North American Numbering Plan (NANP) for most of northeastern and central Ontario in Canada. Area code 705 was created in a 1957 split from portions of the 613 and 519 numbering plan areas. After a reduction in geographic coverage in 1962, the region covered by this area code was assigned a second area code, 249, in an overlay plan in 2011.  A third area code, 683, was then added, effective June 2022.

History
Ontario received two area codes, 416 and 613, in the initial configuration of the North American Numbering Plan in 1947. Area code 416, in the southern part of the province, was split in 1953 to form area code 519 in the western part of the province. In 1957, area code 705 was  created from portions of the 613 and 519 numbering plan areas and served nearly all of Ontario north and west of the Golden Horseshoe. In 1962, the resulting numbering plan area was reduced in geographic extent by splitting off a portion with area code 807 for northwestern Ontario. Area code 705 was not close to exhaustion, but creating a new area code was thought necessary to improve routing of calls from Manitoba and the rest of Western Canada to northwestern Ontario.

On March 19, 2011, the remaining 705 numbering plan area area was assigned a second area code, 249, with the configuration of an overlay plan. Since then, all calls have required ten-digit dialling.

The Canadian Numbering Administration Consortium had considered "erasing" the 807-705 boundary and turning 807 into an overlay for all of northern Ontario, which would have effectively reversed the 1962 split, but did not recommend the idea for fear of potential confusion.

The incumbent local exchange carriers in 705/249 are Bell Canada, Northern Telephone, Bell Aliant (Ontera), Eastlink, Nexicom, and some municipally-owned carriers.

In February 2017, area code 683 was reserved as a third area code for the region.  After further debate, it was decided to activate 683 as a third overlaid area code for this region, effective June 18, 2022.

Service area
As of 2016, the numbering plan area has the following exchanges:

Abitibi Canyon (705) - 334
Alban (249) - 206, 318, 425  (705) - 857
Algoma Mills (249) - 302, 456, 500, 508, 801  (705) - 208, 227, 573, 849
Algonquin Park (249) - 563, 596  (705) - 633
Alliston (249) - 221, 424, 501, 505, 523, 593, 594, 849, 867, 890  (705) - 250, 391, 415, 434, 435, 440, 502, 530, 890, 900
Angus See Borden-Angus below
Apsley (249) - 334, 648  (705) - 656
Attawapiskat (249) - 445  (705) - 997
Azilda (249) - 229, 270, 512  (705) - 512
Bailieboro (249) - 647, 799  (705) - 940
Bala (249) - 389, 539, 605  (705) - 762
Barrie (249) - 288, 315, 359, 388, 444, 489, 495, 498, 535, 562, 595, 733, 800, 869, 877, 880, 888, 938, 989  (705) - 220, 229, 241, 252, 279, 300, 302, 305, 309, 315, 321, 331, 333, 354, 393, 401, 408, 417, 481, 500, 503, 623, 625, 627, 712, 715, 716, 717, 718, 719, 720, 721, 722, 725, 726, 727, 728, 730, 733, 734, 735, 737, 739, 770, 780, 790, 791, 792, 794, 795, 796, 797, 798, 800, 812, 814, 816, 817, 818, 828, 881, 896, 903, 915, 970, 984, 985, 986, 993, 999
Batchawana Bay (249) - 457  (705) - 882
Baysville (249) - 540, 564, 606  (705) - 767
Beaverton (249) - 588, 934  (705) - 217, 426, 504
Bethany (249) - 335, 646, 755  (705) - 276, 277, 608
Biscotasing (249) -  271, 289  (705) - 239
Blezard Valley (249) -  230, 272  (705) - 442, 485, 547, 588, 823, 897
Blind River (249) -  458, 974  (705) - 356, 576
Bluewater Beach (249) - 367, 667  (683) - 666  (705) - 361, 518
Bobcaygeon (249) - 290, 329, 488, 490  (705) - 213, 392, 731, 738
Bonfield (249) - 405, 965  (705) - 776
Borden-Angus (249) - 227, 294, 368, 616, 668  (705) - 230, 410, 423, 424, 516
Bracebridge (249) - 218, 299, 390, 403, 422, 487, 502  (705) - 204, 205, 394, 637, 640, 641, 644, 645, 646, 706, 708, 801, 952
Brechin (249) - 251, 369, 454, 617, 669, 881  (705) - 484, 505, 714
Bridgenorth (249) - 336, 576, 645  (705) - 292, 296, 954
Britt (249) - 565  (705) - 383
Bruce Mines (249) - 459, 975  (705) - 785
Buckhorn (249) - 337, 644, 902  (705) - 657, 659, 979
Burk's Falls (249) - 391, 597  (705) - 382
Burleigh Falls (249) - 643  (705) - 654, 700
Callander (249) - 406  (705) - 713, 752
Calstock (705) - 463
Cambray (705) - 374
Cameron (249) - 630  (705) - 359
Campbellford (249) - 339, 503, 509  (705) - 202, 395, 409, 632, 653, 661, 947
Cannington (249) - 330, 556  (705) - 214, 432, 964
Capreol (249) - 231, 273  (705) - 244, 397, 589, 824, 858
Carnarvon (705) - 489
Cartier (249) - 274, 304  (705) - 965
Cavan (705) - 944
Chapleau (249) - 276, 305, 319, 897  (705) - 600, 860, 864, 870, 902, 904
Chelmsford (249) - 232, 277, 536  (705) - 855
Christian Island (249) - 370, 670  (705) - 247
Chub Lake (249) - 303, 461  (705) - 841
Cobalt (705) - 629, 631, 679
Coboconk (249) - 331  (705) - 216, 454
Cochrane (249) - 313  (705) - 271, 272, 913
Coldwater (249) - 538, 557  (705) - 686
Collingwood (249) - 225, 399, 489, 499, 522, 533, 550, 553, 660, 759, 882, 887, 899  (705) - 293, 351, 416, 441, 443, 444, 445, 446, 467, 532, 539, 606, 607, 888, 994
Coniston (249) - 233, 279  (705) - 453, 591, 694, 829
Connaught (705) - 363
Cookstown (249) - 252, 371, 663, 883  (683) - 444  (705) - 291, 458, 916
Creemore (249) - 253, 372, 671  (705) - 466, 520
Desbarats (249) - 462  (705) - 782
Deux Rivieres (249) - 407  (705) - 747
Dokis (249) - 408  (705) - 763
Dorset (249) - 392, 598  (705) - 766
Dubreuilville (249) - 280, 312  (705) - 884
Dunsford (249) - 361  (705) - 793
Dwight (249) - 566, 599  (705) - 635
Earlton (705) - 563
Echo Bay (249) - 463, 957  (705) - 248
Elk Lake (705) - 678
Elliot Lake (249) - 260, 404, 464, 960  (705) - 261, 461, 578, 827, 847, 848
Elmvale (249) - 254, 306, 672  (683) - 600  (705) - 322, 515
Emsdale (249) - 541, 567, 600  (705) - 636
Englehart (705) - 544, 545, 961
Espanola (249) - 200, 201, 202, 217, 234, 281, 402, 999  (705) - 480, 501, 583, 601, 862, 863, 869, 936
Estaire (249) - 314  (705) - 695
Fauquier (705) - 339, 376
Fenelon Falls (249) - 291, 933, 998  (705) - 215, 886, 887
Field (249) - 409  (705) - 758
Foleyet (249) - 282, 496  (705) - 899
Fort Albany (249) - 316  (705) - 278
Garson (249) - 235, 284, 513  (705) - 459, 550, 592, 693, 699, 830
Gogama (249) - 285, 365, 575  (705) - 602, 894, 895
Gooderham (705) - 447
Gore Bay (249) - 497, 746  (705) - 210, 282, 348
Goulais River (249) - 465, 961  (705) -  301, 649
Gowganda (705) - 624
Gravenhurst (249) - 300, 420, 423  (705) - 681, 684, 687, 703, 710
Greater Sudbury (249) - 203, 239, 266, 350, 360, 377, 431, 651, 804, 805, 806, 864, 878, 879, 885, 977, 979  (705) - 207, 222, 280, 404, 419, 449, 470, 479, 507, 521, 522, 523, 524, 525, 560, 561, 562, 564, 566, 585, 586, 618, 621, 626, 662, 664, 665, 669, 670, 671, 673, 674, 675, 677, 682, 688, 690, 691, 698, 699, 805, 806, 822, 885, 918, 919, 920, 921, 923, 929, 988
Haileybury (705) - 407, 630, 672, 680
Haliburton (249) - 773, 802  (705) -  306, 455, 457, 809, 854, 935
Hanmer (249) - 236, 242, 514  (705) - 451, 551, 593, 831, 969
Hastings (249) - 340, 517, 642  (705) - 609, 696, 697, 922
Havelock (249) - 298, 341, 641  (705) - 778, 803, 838
Hawk Junction (249) - 243, 382  (705) - 889
Hearst (249) - 363  (705) - 362, 372, 373, 960
Honey Harbour (249) - 432, 601  (705) - 756, 906
Huntsville (249) - 216, 228, 338, 435, 478, 549, 558, 699, 700, 722, 778, 822, 833, 995  (705) - 224, 349, 380, 388, 535, 571, 704, 783, 784, 787, 788, 789, 909, 990
Iron Bridge (249) - 466, 962  (705) - 509, 843
Iroquois Falls (705) - 231, 232, 258
Johnson - See Desbarats
Kamiskotia (705) - 365
Kapuskasing (249) - 874, 994  (705) - 319, 332, 335, 337, 347, 371, 557, 577
Kashechewan (705) - 275
Keene (705) - 295
Killarney (249) - 245, 320, 384  (705) - 287
Kinmount (705) - 488
Kirkfield (249) - 333, 632  (705) - 438
Kirkland Lake (249) - 355, 592, 654, 992  (705) - 462, 567, 568, 570, 572, 668, 962
Lafontaine (249) - 255, 373, 673  (683) - 333  (705) - 533
Lakefield (249) - 342, 518, 640  (705) - 651, 652
Larder Lake (705) - 638, 643
Latchford (705) - 676
Lefroy (249) - 207, 212, 374  (683) - 777  (705) - 290, 456
Levack (249) - 237, 244  (705) - 554, 595, 832, 966
Lindsay (249) - 332, 346, 477, 70, 703  (705) - 212, 289, 307, 308, 320, 324, 328, 340, 341, 344, 464, 701, 702, 821, 878, 879, 880, 928, 934, 982
Little Britain (249) - 629, 633  (705) - 786
Little Current (249) - 247, 321, 386, 997  (705) - 368, 370, 398, 603, 968
Lively (249) - 238, 246  (705) - 379, 483, 556, 596, 692, 836
Mactier (249) - 393, 542, 607  (705) - 375
Magnetawan (249) - 568, 602  (705) - 387
Markstay (249) - 248, 426, 491, 803  (705) - 598, 853
Marten River (705) - 892
Massey (249) - 250, 322, 401  (705) - 582, 602, 865
Matachewan (705) - 565
Matheson (705) - 273
Mattawa (249) - 400, 410, 966, 996  (705) - 200, 218, 281, 744
McKellar (249) - (705) - 389
Midland (249) - 301, 307, 492, 554, 559, 649, 893  (683) - 800  (705) - 209, 245, 427, 433, 526, 527, 528, 529, 540, 543, 937, 956
Milford Bay (249) - 569  (705) - 764
Millbrook (705) - 932
Mindemoya (249) - 777  (705) - 377
Minden (705) - 286
Missanabie (249) - 263, 429  (705) - 234
Moonbeam (705) - 367, 681
Moonstone (249) - 308, 552, 618, 674, 875, 876  (705) - 666, 834, 835
Moose Factory (705) - 658
Moosonee (705) - 336, 912
Nephton (249) - 639  (705) - 877, 891
New Liskeard (249) - 863, 991  (705) - 425, 622, 628, 647, 648, 650, 948
Nobel (249) - 570  (705) - 342
Noelville (249) - 264, 323, 430  (705) - 605, 898
North Bay  (249) - 328, 352, 358, 362, 506, 591, 650, 774, 983  (705) - 223, 303, 316, 358, 402, 471, 472, 474, 475, 476, 477, 478, 482, 490, 491, 492, 493, 494, 495, 496, 497, 498, 499, 667, 707, 825, 839, 840, 845, 978, 980, 995
Norwood (249) - 577, 638, 932  (705) - 639, 660, 837
Oakwood (249) - 634  (705) - 953
Oba (249) - 265, 292, 438  (705) - 883
Omemee (249) - 344, 637, 903, 922  (705) - 799, 802, 974
Opasatika (705) - 369, 390
Ophir (249) - 467  (705) - 736
Orillia (249) - 209, 385, 449, 749, 891  (705) - 238, 242, 259, 298, 323, 325, 326, 327, 329, 330, 345, 350, 413, 418, 558, 619, 826, 907, 955
Oro-Medonte (249) - 208, 309, 520  (683) - 500  (705) - 353, 487
Otter Lake (249) -  224, 571  (705) - 378
Parry Sound  (249) - 219, 287, 317, 701, 866, 988  (705) - 203, 346, 746, 751, 771, 773, 774, 901, 938, 996
Peawanuck (705) - 473
Pefferlaw (249) -204, 241, 295, 349, 434, 665, 886  (705) - 318, 437, 513
Penetanguishene (249) - 256, 375, 455, 521  (705) - 355, 549, 614
Peterborough (249) - 353, 357, 387, 494, 504, 510, 516, 688, 872, 900, 901  (705) - 201, 243, 270, 304, 312, 313, 400, 403, 486, 536, 559, 616, 740, 741, 742, 743, 745, 748, 749, 750, 755, 760, 761, 768, 772, 775, 808, 813, 868, 872, 874, 875, 876, 917, 926, 927, 930, 931, 933, 957, 977, 991
Pineal Lake (249) - 278  (705) - 861
Pointe Au Baril (249) - 394, 608  (705) - 366
Port Carling (249) - 395, 436, 543, 609  (705) - 765, 757
Port Loring (249) - 412, 967  (705) - 757
Port McNicoll (249) - 257, 364, 675  (705) - 506, 534
Port Sydney (249) - 572  (705) - 385, 405
Powassan (249) - 413, 968  (705) - 724
Ramore (705) - 236
Ramsay (249) - 293, 439  (705) - 299
Redbridge (249) - 414  (705) - 663
Restoule (249) - 415  (705) - 729
Rosseau (249) - 222, 396  (705) - 732
Sault Ste. Marie (249) - 356, 383, 479, 493, 507, 525, 622, 865, 889, 982, 990  (705) - 206, 251, 253, 254, 255, 256, 257, 260, 297, 420, 450, 541, 542, 574, 575, 759, 777, 779, 908, 910, 941, 942, 943, 945, 946, 949, 963, 971,  975, 987, 989, 992, 998
Searchmont (249) - 469  (705) - 781
Sebright (249) - 376, 676  (683) - 888  (705) - 833
Severn Bridge (2490) - 258, 347, 378, 661  (683) - 400  (705) - 514, 689
Silverwater (249) - 440, 788  (705) - 283
Smooth Rock Falls (249) - 545  (705) - 314, 338
South Porcupine (705) - 235, 240, 412, 579
South River (249) - 573, 603  (705) - 386
Spanish (249) - 325, 441, 789, 898  (705) - 844, 846
Sprucedale (249) - 574  (705) - 685
St. Charles (249) - 324, 427, 790  (705) - 867
St. Joseph Island (249) - 470, 963  (705) - 246
Stayner (249) - 220, 379, 662, 892   (705) - 428, 430, 517
Stroud (249) - 259, 380, 664, 941  (683) - 300  (705) - 294, 431, 436, 615
Sturgeon Falls (249) - 215, 416, 515  (705) - 452, 580, 753, 893
Sudbury - see Greater Sudbury above
Sultan (249) - 442, 791  (705) - 233
Sunderland (705) - 219, 357, 973
Sundridge (249) - 397, 604  (705) - 384
Swastika (705) - 469, 642
Temagami (705) - 237, 569
Thessalon (249) - 471, 964  (705) - 508, 842
Thorne (249) - 417  (705) - 981
Timmins (249) - 351, 361, 750, 870  (705) - 221, 225, 262, 264, 265, 266, 267, 268, 269, 274, 288, 360, 399, 406, 465, 531, 620, 709, 951
Trout Creek (249) - 418  (705) - 723
Udora (249) - 205, 296, 433, 484, 666, 949  (705) - 228, 317
Verner (249) - 214, 419  (705) - 581, 594
Virginiatown (705) - 364
Warkworth (249) - 297, 345, 636  (705) - 924, 925
Warren (249) - 267, 326, 428, 792  (705) - 599, 967
Wasaga Beach (249) - 261, 381, 589, 895  (705) - 352, 422, 429, 617
Waubaushene (249) - 262, 366, 677  (683) - 200  (705) - 510, 538
Wawa (249) - 268, 327, 443  (705) - 414, 804, 850, 852, 856, 914
West Guilford (249) - 993  (705) - 754, 854
Westree (249) - 446, 793  (705) - 263
Whitefish (249) - 240, 447, 794  (705) - 546, 597, 866
Whitefish Falls (249) - 269, 448, 795  (705) - 284, 285
Wilberforce (705) - 448
Windermere (249) - 398  (705) - 769
Woodville (249) - 635  (705) - 439, 972
Premium calls: 1+(249/705)-976.

See also
List of North American area codes

References

External links
CNA Exchange Codes list for 705, 249
Area Code Map of Canada

705
Communications in Ontario